"Sunset Grill" is a song by Don Henley from his 1984 album Building the Perfect Beast. The song peaked at number 7 on the Billboard Top Rock Tracks chart in January 1985. Released as the fourth single from the album in August 1985, it peaked at number 22 on the Billboard Hot 100 in October 1985.

History
Patty Smyth sings harmony vocals on this song, while Pino Palladino plays fretless bass.  Randy Newman arranged the synthesizer programming for the song.

The title and lyrics of the song reference the Sunset Grill, a hamburger restaurant on Sunset Boulevard in Los Angeles, California.

Reception
Billboard said that the "deliberate rock beat and dense synths build an effective mood of aimless discontent."  Cashbox said that "this melancholy and dynamic track is orchestrated beautifully and Henley’s vocals are right on."

Personnel 
 Don Henley – lead vocals 
 Michael Boddicker – synthesizers, E-mu Emulator
 Benmont Tench – synthesizers
 David Paich – acoustic piano solo 
 Danny Kortchmar – guitars, guitar synthesizer solo, horns solo 
 Pino Palladino – fretless bass 
 Patty Smyth – harmony vocals 
 Synthesizer arrangements by Michael Boddicker, Don Henley, Danny Kortchmar, Benmont Tench and Randy Newman.
 Horns arrangements by Jerry Hey

Chart performance

References

1985 singles
Don Henley songs
Songs written by Danny Kortchmar
Songs written by Don Henley
West Hollywood, California
Songs written by Benmont Tench
1984 songs
Geffen Records singles
Songs about restaurants